Tímea Babos and Kristina Mladenovic were the defending champions, but chose not to participate this year. 
Xenia Knoll and Aleksandra Krunić won the title, defeating Tatjana Maria and Raluca Olaru in the final, 6–3, 6–0.

Seeds
The top seeds received a bye into the quarterfinals.

Draw

References
 Main Draw

2016 WTA Tour
2016 Doubles
2016 in Moroccan tennis